FAI World Grand Prix Gliding Championships are gliding competitions promoted by the Fédération Aéronautique Internationale (FAI) for gliders that are both more spectacular and more easily understood by the public than conventional gliding competitions.

Origins

Gliding competitions existed before the Second World War but as the technologies evolved, the performance of the gliders has taken them away from the public view. Furthermore the scoring is complex and gliders can start at different times. Proposals were made in 1970 but it was not until 2005 that first world gliding competition in Grand Prix format was held in France at Saint Auban.  This was at the Salon Européen du Vol à Voile (European Sailplane Show/Exhibition) in 2005 as part of the FAI's marketing strategy to promote the sport of gliding by establishing annual international competitions.

Competition formula 
In a gliding Grand Prix the gliders race in competition close together around a pre-set task.  A smaller number of competitors reduces the risks of the simultaneous start. A place-scoring system provides rewards for excellence without unduly punishing a poor performance.

 A task, typically 2-3 hour in duration and between 200 and 400 km in length is set.
 All gliders start at the same time (similar to a yacht race).
 The gliders must cross the short start line not above a set height and not faster than a set maximum speed.
 The start/finish line is generally close to the airfield so that it can be observed by spectators.
 Gliders race around the task. No team flying is permitted. The first one home wins as they all started at the same time and there is no handicapping.
 A place scoring system is used, with 1 point for every finisher you beat, plus a bonus point for coming home first. (similar to a Motor Grand Prix).

Scoring

Tactics 
 Pilots aim to fly as fast as possible, because there is little incentive to keep fellow competitors in sight to preserve a big lead overall by only losing by a few points on a given day
 Flying around the task with a group of other gliders is often not beneficial, because if you come home only a few seconds behind the group, you could lose many points
 The aim is to be in front at the finish, so making bold tactical moves can mean a big difference in results

See also
 Results of Grand Prix series
FAI World Grand Prix 2007
FAI World Grand Prix 2008 (Grand Prix final on 2–9 January 2010, Santiago de Chile)
FAI World Grand Prix 2010–2011
FAI World Grand Prix 2012–2013
European and World Gliding Championships
First UK Gliding Grand Prix at Cambridge Gliding Centre

References

External links 
Grand Prix Gliding 
FAI: 1st World Sailplane Grand Prix in Saint Auban, Salon Européen du Vol à Voile (European Sailplane Show/Exhibition)

Gliding competitions